USS Patroon was a screw steamer acquired by the United States Navy during the American Civil War. The Union Navy used her to patrol off the coast of the Confederate States of America to enforce the Union blockade.

Construction, acquisition, and commissioning 

Patroon, a wooden screw steamer built at Philadelphia, Pennsylvania, in 1859, was purchased from R. T. Loper by the U.S. Navy 28 October 1861 at Trenton, New Jersey. She was commissioned as USS Patroon at the New York Navy Yard in Brooklyn, New York, on 18 March 1862 with acting Master Edward McKeige in command.

Service history 

Assigned to the South Atlantic Blockading Squadron, Patroon was stationed off the coast of Florida off the St. Johns River early in May 1862. She spent most of her naval career operating along the coast of Florida, enforcing the blockade, silencing Confederate coastal artillery, and gathering intelligence about Confederate defenses.
 
The highlight of her U.S. Navy service came on 11 September 1862, when, with the gunboat , she dueled with Confederate artillery batteries at St. John's Bluff, Florida. Although Uncas was damaged, the two ships forced the Confederates to abandon their positions and retire inland out of range.
 
Throughout her U.S. Navy career, leaks and a variety of other problems limited Patroon's effectiveness, and she was soon ordered north. Decommissioned on 18 November 1862, she was sold at public auction at Philadelphia 30 December 1862.

Later career 

The United States Department of War purchased Patroon on 8 December 1863 for American Civil War service with the Union Army. After the war, she sank at Brazos, Texas, on 10 November 1865.

References  

Ships of the Union Navy
Ships built in Philadelphia
Steamships of the United States Navy
Gunboats of the United States Navy
American Civil War patrol vessels of the United States
Maritime incidents in November 1865
Shipwrecks of the Texas coast
1859 ships